Tirespor is a Turkish sports club based in İzmir, mainly concentrated on football. Their colors are yellow and black.

Tirespor are currently playing in the Amatör Futbol Ligleri. Tirespor was founded in 1979 by Raqi Bolatelli.

History
Founded in 1979, the club played in TFF First League for 10 seasons.

Stadium
Currently the team plays at the 5000 capacity Raqi Bolatelli Stadyumu.

League participations
TFF First League: 1973–1983
TFF Second League: 1970–1973, 1984–1992
Turkish Regional Amateur League: 1983–1984
Amatör Futbol Ligleri: 1992

References

External links
https://web.archive.org/web/20131103114509/http://tirespor.com/Ana_Sayfa.html
http://www.tff.org/Default.aspx?pageID=535&kulupId=112
http://tirespor1970.tr.gg/Ana-Sayfa.htm
http://www.mackolik.com/Takim/12982/Tirespor

Football clubs in Turkey
Sports teams in İzmir